Bag Limit is a crime novel written by Steven F. Havill. It is a first person view story of a reluctant sheriff of Posados County named Bill Gastner.

Plot summary
Sheriff Bill Gastner hopes his last few days in office will be uneventful, but this is before a local 17-year-old named Matt Baca drives drunkenly into his cruiser. Baca stumbles drunkenly into the night as Gastner confronts him. He is later arrested passed out at his home. After kicking open sheriff Gastner's temporary cruisers window, he is transferred to a local Border Patrol unit. The transfer turns fatal when Baca pushes himself away, accidentally into a delivery trucks path. The plot thickens as the dead teens father is found dead in his kitchen the next morning. Thus bringing Gastner into a confusing set of clues to lead him to why Baca kept fighting his arrest, where is and where did he get his fake I.D., and who was involved in the struggle with Matt Baca's father leading to his death.

2001 novels
American crime novels
St. Martin's Press books